Gabe Okoye is Nigerian–American civil engineer, former chair, and a current commissioner of planning in Gwinnett County. On November 8, 2022, he became a legislator elect at the 2022 US midterm elections representing Georgia State and he took office on January 9, 2023.

Biography 
Okoye is a native of Enugwu-Aguleri. He relocated to United States in 1981. He started his struggle as security guard. He found his way to the college where he became a civil engineer and eventually founded a company called Essex Geoscientist. Okoye is married with four children and has been living in Atlanta, the headquarters of Gwinnett County, since 1992

Political career 
Okoye is a Democrats and he  became the Gwinnett party  chairman in 2016. In 2018, he recorded massive wins that captured 13 seats out of the 25 seats available in the county. This historic wins made the  Georgia House of Representatives with Resolution 313 of 2019 declared November 6 of 2019  as Gabe Okoye Leadership Day.

References 

African-American people in Georgia (U.S. state) politics
Gwinnett County, Georgia
Living people
Georgia (U.S. state) Democrats
Civil engineers
Candidates in the 2022 United States House of Representatives elections
Year of birth missing (living people)